Dmitry Chernykh may refer to:

Dmitry Chernykh (footballer) (born 1979), Russian footballer
Dmitri Chernykh (ice hockey) (born 1985), Russian ice hockey player

See also 
 Chernykh (surname)